Bernard Leslie Trafford (3 September 1902 – 17 July 1964) was an Australian rules footballer who played with  in the Victorian Football League (VFL).

Early life
The son of Albert Edward Trafford (1875–1955) and Margaret Ann Trafford, nee Joyce (1876–1942), Bernard Leslie Trafford was born in Brunswick on 3 September 1902.

Football
Trafford joined Hawthorn from East Brunswick at the start of the 1926 VFL season and after playing for the reserves for most of the season he made his debut against Richmond in Round 15 and scored a goal on debut. Trafford played another senior game two weeks later and two more games in 1927 but never secured a regular spot in the side.

In 1928 he transferred to Preston but failed to gain a position in the senior side.

Later life
Bernie Trafford married Nancy Adelaide James in 1928 and they lived in Melbourne until her death in 1954. Trafford subsequently lived with his daughter until his death in 1964. He is buried at Fawkner Memorial Cemetery.

References

External links 

1902 births
1964 deaths
Australian rules footballers from Melbourne
Hawthorn Football Club players
People from Brunswick, Victoria